The 1957–58 Swedish Division I season was the 14th season of Swedish Division I. Djurgardens IF won the league title by finishing first in the final round.

First round

Northern Group

Southern Group

Final round

External links
 1957–58 season

Swe
Swedish Division I seasons
1957–58 in Swedish ice hockey